Great Big Sea is the self-titled debut album by Canadian folk-rock band Great Big Sea released in 1993. Originally released in 1993, it was later redistributed by Warner Music Canada when the band was signed.

Label 

Independent, later redistributed under Warner Music Canada

Track listing
"Great Big Sea/Gone By The Board" (Traditional Arranged Bob Hallett) 3:39
"Someday Soon" (Alan Doyle) 4:18
"Excursion Around The Bay" (Johnny Burke) 2:30
"What Are Ya' At?" (Alan Doyle) 3:12
"The Fisherman's Lament" (Séan McCann) 5:11
"I'se The B'y" (Traditional) 1:57
"Drunken Sailor" (Traditional) 2:54
"Irish Paddy/Festival Reel/Roger's Reel" (Traditional, Arranged Alan Doyle, Séan McCann, Bob Hallett, Darrell Power, Benoit / Guinchard) 4:20
"Time Brings" (Séan McCann) 4:31
"Jigs: Eavesdropper's/Both Meat & Drink/Off We Go" (Reavy, Traditional) 3:01
"Berry Picking Time" (Traditional) 3:20

Song information
"Great Big Sea/Gone By The Board" is one song that goes by two names.
"Irish Paddy/Festival Reel/Roger's Reel" and "Jigs: Eavesdropper's/Both Meat & Drink/Off We Go" are each three separate folk songs that Great Big Sea arranged into a single track.

External links 
Great Big Sea Debut Album

1993 debut albums
Great Big Sea albums